All Love Everything is the fifth studio album by American musician Aloe Blacc. The album was released on October 2, 2020, through BMG. The album includes the singles "I Do", "My Way", and "Hold On Tight".

Background
In an interview with Spin, Blacc said, "All Love Everything is about togetherness, it's about family and my personal relationships, which obviously have further developed with COVID. Every weekend I do family Zooms, I'm with my kids pretty much 24/7 and my wife so togetherness really is a true theme when it comes to my life. No one would have predicted that but this is where we are and I'm glad that I'm still releasing the album whereas other artists might be holding back but in my mind, this is the perfect messaging for right now. I hope these songs give people an opportunity to reflect on the people in their lives that are close to them. A song like 'Glory Days' is a song about making today and every day your glory days rather than looking back longingly or nostalgically at the past. Then there's a song called 'My Family' which is another opportunity for people to look at their mom, their kids, their parents, their significant other more closely and just giving them a song to sing about them." A deluxe edition was released on March 12, 2021.

Singles
"I Do" was released as the lead single from the album on February 14, 2020. "My Way" was released as the second single from the album on June 25, 2020. "Hold On Tight" was released as the third single from the album on September 4, 2020. "I Do" was released as a single again, this time as a duet with country-pop-rock singer, LeAnn Rimes, on February 12, 2021 for the release of the deluxe edition of the album.

Track listing
Credits adapted from Tidal.

Charts

Release history

References

2020 albums
Aloe Blacc albums
Albums produced by Jonas Jeberg
Albums produced by Jon Levine